"Legacy" is a song by Chester rock band Mansun. It was released as a single in 1998 from the group's album, Six, and was the lead track on Eight EP. It follows a similar template to many of the group's other hits and was also their highest-charting single, peaking at  7 in the UK Singles Chart.

Overview
"Legacy" was released as the first single from Mansun's second album, Six. It preceded the album by three months, but is somewhat unrepresentative of the overall sound of its parent album. It bears similarities with "Wide Open Space" and "Closed for Business"; two of the band's most popular singles. The song references the Marquis de Sade. The song's name was later used as the title for the group's retrospective compilation Legacy: The Best of Mansun in 2005. The closing refrain "Nobody cares when you're gone" were later reused as the title of a documentary about the group included on DVD editions of the Legacy: The Best of Mansun compilation.

The music video was directed by Mike Mills. After the controversial "Taxloss" video, it is probably their most unconventional and well known video. The video parodies the group and others like themselves, sending up the clichés of male pop and rock bands and the experience of the music industry. The entirety of the video is performed by simplistic and jerkily animated puppets against unconvincing but humorous cardboard backdrops.

B-sides
The single was released in the final week of 1998 that allowed singles to have four tracks on each format. The new chart rules were instated the following week that meant that singles could only be eligible to chart with three tracks per format. The four-track EP was nostalgically valued by many musicians; this compromised the Mansun releases, which had offered value and incentives to fans by cramming numerous B-sides on each format. For example, "Legacy" provided a wealth or a plethora of content depending on a person's disposition by having five original B-sides, a remix, two versions of "Legacy" and two acoustic re-recordings across the single's four formats.

After the instatement of the new chart rules, ineligible four-track EPs were released as statements by musicians; the premise was to elevate the material as being a whole as opposed to a commercial pop hit. 3 Colours Red's EP Paralyse (1998) and Who the Fuck Are Arctic Monkeys? (2006) by Arctic Monkeys are examples of the practice. The chart rules were revised in October 2007 allowing four-track releases under the 'Maxi' name.

Track listings

Personnel
Mansun
 Dominic Chad – Guitar, Backing Vocals, Bass ("Spasm of Identity")
 Paul Draper – Vocals, Guitar
 Andie Rathbone – Drums
 Stove – Bass

Production

 Paul Draper – producer ("Legacy")
 Mark 'Spike' Stent – producer ("Legacy"), mixing ("Legacy", "Spasm of Identity", "Face in the Crowd"), recording ("Spasm of Identity", "Face in the Crowd")
 Mike Hunter – additional recording ("Legacy", "Face in the Crowd"), engineer ("Legacy"), recording ("Can't Afford to Die", "Check Under the Bed", "GSOH", "Wide Open Space (The Perfecto Remix)", "The Impending Collapse of It All (Acoustic)", "Ski Jump Nose (Acoustic)")
 Ian Grimble – mixing ("Can't Afford to Die", "Check Under the Bed", "GSOH", "The Impending Collapse of It All (Acoustic)", "Ski Jump Nose (Acoustic)")

 Ian Caple – recording ("Wide Open Space (The Perfecto Remix)")
 Paul Oakenfold and Steve Osborne – additional production and remix ("Wide Open Space (The Perfecto Remix)")
 Danton Supple – remix engineer ("Wide Open Space (The Perfecto Remix)")
 Alex Sava – remix programmer ("Wide Open Space (The Perfecto Remix)")
 Pennie Smith – photography

Charts

References

1998 singles
Mansun songs
Songs written by Paul Draper (musician)